The men's middleweight event was part of the weightlifting programme at the 1936 Summer Olympics. The weight class was the third-lightest contested, and allowed weightlifters of up to 75 kilograms (165 pounds). The competition was held on Wednesday, 5 August 1936.

Medalists

Records
These were the standing world and Olympic records (in kilograms) prior to the 1936 Summer Olympics.

Khadr El-Touni set a new Olympic record in press, snatch and in clean and jerk.

Results

All figures in kilograms.

References

Sources
 Olympic Report	

Middleweight